Thomas Colapietro (born 1940) is a former Democratic Connecticut State Senator who represented Bristol, Plainville, Plymouth, and part of Harwinton.

He was born and lives in Bristol, Connecticut.

References

External links
 Biography

1940 births
Living people
People from Bristol, Connecticut
Democratic Party Connecticut state senators